Yelena Borisovna Bobrova  (born 23 August 1974) is a Russian retired ice hockey player. As a member of the Russian national team, she competed in the women's ice hockey tournament at the 2002 Winter Olympics in Salt Lake City and at the IIHF Women's World Championship in 1997, 2001, and 2007; she was the reserve skater for the Russian team at the 1999 IIHF Women's World Championship.

References

External links
 
 

1974 births
Living people
Ice hockey players at the 2002 Winter Olympics
Olympic ice hockey players of Russia
Russian women's ice hockey defencemen
Sportspeople from Krasnoyarsk
HC SKIF players
HC Tornado players